Mauidrillia cinctuta  is an extinct species of sea snail, a marine gastropod mollusk in the family Horaiclavidae.

Description
The length of the shell attains 7 mm, its diameter 3 mm.

Distribution
This extinct marine species was found in Tertiary strata of the Chatton shellbed, New Zealand.

References

 Maxwell, P.A. (2009). Cenozoic Mollusca. pp. 232–254 in Gordon, D.P. (ed.) New Zealand inventory of biodiversity. Volume one. Kingdom Animalia: Radiata, Lophotrochozoa, Deuterostomia. Canterbury University Press, Christchurch

External links
 Museum of New Zealand: Mauidrillia cinctuta

cinctuta
Gastropods described in 1929